FC Abinsk is a Russian football club from Abinsk, founded in 2008. In its first year of existence, FC Abinsk came 1st in the South zone of the Amateur Football League and advanced to the Russian Second Division for 2009.

On July 8, 2009 the club was removed from the Russian Second Division for not coming to a second scheduled game. All their results were annulled and removed from the competition record.

External links
Club profile

References

Association football clubs established in 2008
Football clubs in Russia
Sport in Krasnodar Krai
2008 establishments in Russia